Karol Franciszek Pollak (15 November 1859 – 17 December 1928) was a Polish electrotechnician, inventor and businessman.

Early life 
Karol Pollak was born in Sanok, Kingdom of Galicia and Lodomeria, part of the Austrian Empire. His father was Karol Pollak (1818–80), who was a printer, bookseller and publisher. Karol (not to be mistaken with his father) worked in his youth as an electrician and showed great technical skills in it. In 1883 he was employed in the laboratory of British company "The Patent Utilisation Co". He designed and recorded his first patents during this period. In 1885 he attended electrotechnics studies at the Royal Polytechnic University in Charlottenburg.

Activity 
In Berlin, Pollak ran electrotechnical factory "G. Wehr Telegraphen-Bau-Anstalt". Later he returned to Britain to commercialize his patents, which were released under anglicised version of his name, "Charles Pollak". In 1886, he became the director of a Paris company of electric tramways of his design. In the meantime he worked on the design of Electrochemical cell. He was very successful in this topic and it made him famous. Later he founded battery factories in Frankfurt, (Germany) and Liesing, Austria. Many battery-manufacturing companies have licensed his designs.

In 1899 he founded his own laboratory and proceeded with further research. He obtained 98 patents on his inventions.

In 1922 he returned to Poland, where a year later he founded a factory in Biała, which exists to the present day. The company started under the name of Polskie Towarzystwo Akumulatorowe and was co-founded by professor and president of Poland, Ignacy Mościcki. However, Pollak was the first president of this company.

Pollak is sometimes referred as the Edison of Poland. In 1925 he received the title Doctor Honoris Causa of Warsaw University of Technology.

Most important inventions 

His numerous inventions also cover other areas, among them: electric motors, color printing device, and a type of microphone. His main activity was related to chemical sources of energy – galvanic cells and batteries. He obtained a patent for manufacturing lead-acid batteries.

He also has designed commutator and electrolytic rectifiers. In 1895 he was the first to suggest the use of full bridge diode rectification circuit, later known by Leo Graetz. In 1896, Pollak invented the electrolytic capacitor

References

Bibliography 

 
 

1859 births
1928 deaths
Polish businesspeople
Polish inventors
People associated with electricity
Businesspeople in electricity